WGME-TV (channel 13) is a television station in Portland, Maine, United States, affiliated with CBS. It is owned by Sinclair Broadcast Group, which provides certain services to Waterville-licensed Fox affiliate WPFO (channel 23) under a local marketing agreement (LMA) with Cunningham Broadcasting. However, Sinclair effectively owns WPFO as the majority of Cunningham's stock is owned by the family of deceased group founder Julian Smith. Both stations share studios on Northport Drive in the North Deering section of Portland, while WGME-TV's transmitter is located on Brown Hill west of Raymond. The station also maintains regional studios in the Lewiston/Auburn area, and the state capital in Augusta.

History

The station's first broadcast was on May 16, 1954, as WGAN-TV, owned by Guy Gannett Communications (no relation to the Gannett Company or its television spinoff, Tegna, which owns WCSH, channel 6) along with WGAN (AM 560) and the Portland Press-Herald daily newspaper.  (An FM station, 102.9 WGAN-FM was added in 1967.) The  transmission tower, situated near Route 121 in Raymond, was built during 1959. It was, according to the 1999 Guinness Book of World Records, the world's tallest architectural structure at the time. This record was surpassed in 1960 by KFVS-TV's tower in Cape Girardeau, Missouri, but the tower remained the tallest structure in Maine until the construction of WMTW's tower during 2002.

When the radio stations were sold during 1983, the WGAN call letters were sold with them. WGAN-TV then changed its call sign to the current "WGME-TV" on December 15 of that year. It remained the main station of Guy Gannett Communications until 1998, when it was sold with most of the company's television stations to the Sinclair Broadcast Group. The Gannetts earned a handsome return on their original investment into WGAN radio in 1938.

WGME owner Sinclair Broadcast Group and Time Warner Cable disputed the terms of their retransmission consent agreement that expired on December 31, 2010. The agreement was extended to January 14, 2011 while the parties continued to negotiate. An agreement in principle to resolve the dispute followed soon thereafter and was finalized in February 2011.

On January 8, 2016, Sinclair announced that American Sports Network would begin on January 16 as a dedicated digital-multicast network in 10 cities, including Portland on WGME.

News operation

Historically associated with a newspaper, channel 13's newscasts dominated the ratings in Portland for many years. However, since 1989, WCSH overtook WGME and has dominated in the ratings. WGME produced 24 hours and 30 minutes of produced news content every week, including early-morning, noon, afternoon drive-time, and late-night news programs. WGME also produced 17 hours of weekly news content for partner station WPFO. When taking both stations into account, WGME produced the most local news content in the Portland market, though its primary station carries the least amount of local news content among the market's three major network affiliates.

Former news team for Live At 5 and News 13 at 6, Kim Block and Doug Rafferty were a news team from the mid-1990s until the mid-2000s. Kim Block is one of the most recognized television journalists in both the Portland market and in the State of Maine/New Hampshire. Block has been the lead anchor at WGME for more than three decades, starting in 1981 until her retirement in 2020, recovering from a concussion in May 2018. Rafferty reduced his reporting hours after suffering a stroke during a live cut-in of a syndicated program on January 19, 2006, quitting the anchor desk for a behind-the-scene technical job at the station. He retired during 2012 to become the Public Relations and Education Head at the Maine State Department of Inland Fisheries and Wildlife. Other longtime anchors include weeknight announcer Gregg Lagerquist and morning announcer Jeff Peterson. Sports anchor and director Dave Eid has been with WGME since 1996. Longtime meteorologist Charlie Lopresti has been with the station for more than a decade.

Starting February 5, 2007, WGME began producing a 10 p.m. newscast on Fox affiliate WPFO after establishing a news-share agreement. Known on-air as Fox 23 News at 10, it is the first prime-time broadcast in the market; as of September 2018, there is now a half-hour 10:00 newscast on CW affiliate WPXT (channel 51). During 2010, due to a revenue-share agreement with WPFO, the station expanded this newscast to an hour and began a two-hour-long morning program on WPFO named Good Day Maine. WPFO pays WGME a fee along with a share of revenue realized from the newscast. Good Day Maine was shortened to one hour by October 2013.

The station began a news partnership with Maine Today Media, owner of its former newspaper sisters: the Portland Press Herald, Kennebec Journal, Morning Sentinel, and Maine Sunday Telegram. In addition to its main studios, WGME operates a Lewiston/Auburn Bureau. A second bureau is in Augusta near the Maine State House. News 13 also has a partnership with the Lewiston/Auburn Sun Journal, using the source very frequently for stories in the twin cities. WGME also shares newsgathering material with WPFO, gaining WGME access to both CBS Newspath and FOX News video footage for the use of all newscasts on both WPFO and on WGME. WGME meteorologists provide the weather forecasts for the Portland Press Herald, the Maine Sunday Telegram, and a variety of radio stations in the Portland market. When providing regional and state coverage, WGME and ABC affiliate WVII-TV in Bangor share content and video footage.

WGME does not produce local weekend morning newscasts, unlike the NBC and ABC affiliates in the Portland market.  Instead, it broadcasts infomercials or E/I (educational and informational) children's programming early on weekends. For national news, the station carries the CBS News-produced CBS Saturday Morning and Sunday Morning.

On October 31, 2013, station owner Sinclair Broadcasting bought all non-license assets of WPFO Fox 23 for $13.6 million. The licensing assets were sold to Cunningham Broadcasting on November 20, 2013, for $3.4 million. Cunningham Broadcasting closed business relationships with Sinclair in stations around the country. The sale made WPFO (FOX) the companion station of WGME (CBS), essentially creating an unofficial duopoly in the Portland market. Though throughout the State of Maine, Gannett owns both WCSH 6 in Portland and WLBZ 2 in Bangor, both NBC affiliates, creating what could be considered a statewide commercial duopoly. In New Hampshire, Hearst Television owns WMUR 9 and in Portland, Maine, WMTW 8, both ABC affiliates. WMTW can be viewed in portions of New Hampshire, overlapping the WMUR viewing area, essentially creating a dual-state duopoly.

On September 11, 2017, WGME launched a half-hour 7:00 pm weeknight newscast. The opportunity came about as a result of CBS Television Distribution's decision to cancel The Insider, which had previously aired on WGME in the 7:30 p.m. weeknight time slot.

Transition to HD
WGME began broadcasting in 720p high definition (HD) on December 18, 2011, with a new wood-styled set designed by Devlin Design Group. WGME's new HD set included video display monitors on either end of the set for anchor stand-up reporting, a 12-monitor video wall used to display a single panoramic video feed or 2, 3, or 12 individual video feeds. A smaller anchor desk at the video wall is used for FOX 23 broadcasts Good Day Maine and News 13 on FOX at 10 pm. The anchor desk included a large monitor behind the anchors which typically showed a skyline image or the News 13 logo. The entire set included an array of light panels and light boxes. The weather office is fully visible to viewers, with a small desk for the meteorologist above which a four-monitor video wall could show graphics. There was also a traditional green screen and a forecasting system on a raised platform for live reporting of severe weather. The HD newscasts introduced a new graphics package also used by Sinclair station WZTV.

WGME's newscasts were referred to as CBS 13 News as of April 2013.  The newscasts on WPFO were referred to as FOX 23 News as of February 2014.

On February 28, 2013, WGME's weather department rolled out new graphics to its Weather Central forecasting system, as part of a new graphics package from parent company Sinclair Broadcasting. It is slowly being introduced on other Sinclair stations.

In early 2014, while WGME-TV CBS 13 News received a new graphics package now seen on-air, News 13 Daybreak changed its name to Good Day Maine On CBS 13.  On September 15, 2014, WPFO-TV FOX 23 premiered the WGME-TV CBS 13-produced FOX 23 News @ 6:30 PM featuring the combined (6 pm and 11 pm) anchor team and a new format.

Subchannels
The station's digital signal is multiplexed:

References

External links
Official website
WPFO "Fox 23"

1954 establishments in Maine
CBS network affiliates
Sinclair Broadcast Group
Stadium (sports network) affiliates
TBD (TV network) affiliates
Television channels and stations established in 1954
GME-TV